William Bradley (10 February 1787 – 30 May 1820), known more commonly as Giant Bradley or the Yorkshire Giant, was a British man known as one of the tallest to ever live, measuring , the same height as Angus MacAskill from Scotland.

Biography
Born in Market Weighton within the East Riding of Yorkshire, William was the fourth son in a family of thirteen and weighed 14 pounds (6.35 kg) at birth. His father, a master tailor (Note: Market Weighton parish registers instead say he was a Butcher) measured , while his siblings and mother Anne were of average size, although one sister who died in an accident at age 16 was tall.

He was said to have been teased at school because of his height, though many students were scared of him. Teachers at the school were said to have punished misbehaving students by getting Bradley to lift them onto high cross beams, until the teacher decided to have them taken down again. After leaving school he worked on a farm near the town of Pocklington, earning less than 10 shillings (50p) a week.

The Yorkshire Giant
Bradley travelled with a group of showmen under the alias of the Yorkshire Giant; at the time, the freak shows were popular and would draw large crowds. As the tallest British man, Bradley was a prized asset in the business joining the huge Yorkshire Pig which was bred in Sancton two miles from Market Weighton.

After touring many fairs up and down the country, including the Hull Fair, he parted from his minder by 1815 to manage himself. He would charge a shilling for each person to visit him in a room which he hired in various towns. He was even presented before King George III at Windsor who gave him a large golden watch on a chain, which he wore for the rest of his life.

Bradley died aged 33 in his hometown of Market Weighton, where he was buried inside the church because of fears of graverobbing. His house still stands on Market Hill. The A1079 road which passes Market Weighton is named Giant Bradley Way.

Giant Community Day
An annual festival is organised in memory of William Bradley in his home town of Market Weighton. The event has been held annually in May since 1996 and is attended by hundreds of people in the town. It is a family-oriented event with games, amusement rides, stalls and other attractions, including the famous "Weighton Lash". Christopher Greener who was the tallest living European for a period of time has taken part in the celebrations in the past.

References

1787 births
People from Market Weighton
1820 deaths
People with gigantism
Sideshow performers